Ilıcak is a village in the Adıyaman District, Adıyaman Province, Turkey. The village is populated by Kurds of the Balyan tribe and had a population of 145 in 2021.

The hamlet of Yukarıkargı is attached to the village.

References 

Villages in Adıyaman District
Kurdish settlements in Adıyaman Province